Ivar Raig (born 25 March 1953 Tartu) is an Estonian economist and politician. He was a member of the VII Riigikogu.

References

Living people
1953 births
20th-century Estonian economists
Members of the Supreme Soviet of the Soviet Union
Members of the Riigikogu, 1992–1995
Estonian University of Life Sciences alumni
21st-century Estonian economists